Echinopsis backebergii is a species of flowering plant in the cactus family Cactaceae, native to eastern Bolivia and southern Peru. Large, showy, carmine-red flowers are borne in summer.

The subspecies E. backebergii subsp. wrightiana has gained the Royal Horticultural Society's Award of Garden Merit.

References

External links
AsanKomara, Echinopsis backebergii pictures

backebergii